is a Buddhist temple in the Abe area of Sakurai, Nara Prefecture, Japan. Dating to the seventh century, it houses a sculptural group by Kaikei, and a kofun within its grounds has been designated a Special Historic Site.

History
Founded as Sūke-ji in the seventh century, in 834 the monk Shinga saw a vision of a golden image of Manjusri (Monju) emerging from a cave within the temple compound. Subsequently, he dedicated a hall, the Monju-dō. The cult grew in popularity in the late Heian period and Ninshō attended the temple regularly.

Buildings

The Hondō, rebuilt several times due to fires, dates to 1665. The single bay nagare-zukuri, shake-roofed Hakusan Jinja Honden (Sengoku period) is an Important Cultural Property. The temple has been renovated in recent years.

Monju pentad
There is a large statue group with a seven-metre high Manjusri (Monju) seated on a lion flanked by four attendants: a young boy, an aged layman, a monk, and a groom, one of a number of such groups dating to the thirteenth and fourteenth centuries. When the statues were dismantled for repairs in the 1930s, the signature of Kaikei, the year 1203, and the names of around fifty donors including both Kaikei and Shunjōbō Chōgen were found inscribed within Manjusri's head.

Kofun
The square-chambered Monju-in Nishi Kofun is located within the grounds of the temple. In 1952 the tomb was designated a Special Historic Site.

See also
 Kofun
 Shinbutsu shūgō
 List of Special Places of Scenic Beauty, Special Historic Sites and Special Natural Monuments
 Thirteen Buddhist Sites of Yamato

References

External links

 Abe Monju-in homepage

Buddhist temples in Nara Prefecture
Special Historic Sites
Important Cultural Properties of Japan